Year 1195 (MCXCV) was a common year starting on Sunday (link will display the full calendar) of the Julian calendar.

Events 
 June 1 – Battle of Shamkor: Georgians defeat the Ildenizids of Azerbaijan.
 July 18 – Battle of Alarcos: Almohad ruler Abu Yusuf Ya'qub al-Mansur decisively defeats Castilian King Alfonso VIII.
 The Priory of St Mary's is founded in Bushmead.
 Alexius III Angelus overthrows Isaac II, and becomes Byzantine Emperor.

Births 
 August 15 – Anthony of Padua, Portuguese preacher and saint (d. 1231)
 Princess Shōshi of Japan (d. 1211)
 Roger de Quincy, 2nd Earl of Winchester (d. 1265)

Deaths 
 March 3 – Hugh de Puiset, bishop of Durham (b. c. 1125)
 August 6 – Henry the Lion, Duke of Saxony and Bavaria (b. 1129)
 October 13 – Gualdim Pais, Great Master of the Templars in Portugal (b. 1118)
 December 17 – Baldwin V, Count of Hainaut (b. 1150)
 Ascelina, French nun and mystic (b. 1121)

References